Khujirt is a sum (district) of Övörkhangai Province in central Mongolia. The total population of the sum in 2008 was 6,649.

Climate

Khujirt has a subarctic climate (Köppen climate classification Dwc) with mild summers and severely cold winters. Most precipitation falls in the summer as rain, with some snow in the adjacent months of May and September. Winters are very dry.

External links

References

Districts of Övörkhangai Province